Charles Aleno (February 19, 1917, in St. Louis, Missouri – on February 10, 2003, in DeLand, Florida) was a Major League Baseball third baseman. He made his major league debut on May 15, 1941, and played his last major league game on September 23, 1944. He shares the record for the longest hitting streak to start a career with David Dahl (17 games, from May 15 to May 31, 1941, during which he hit .389). After his remarkably hot start, however, Aleno cooled off dramatically, hitting .157 for the rest of his major league career, and finishing with a career average of .209.  Aleno played his entire major league career for the Cincinnati Reds.

Sources

1917 births
2003 deaths
Baseball managers
Atlanta Crackers players
Baseball players from Missouri
Birmingham Barons players
Cincinnati Reds players
Columbus Red Birds players
Durham Bulls players
Fort Lauderdale Braves players
Indianapolis Indians players
Kansas City Blues (baseball) players
Lakeland Pilots players
Major League Baseball third basemen
Minor league baseball managers
Muskogee Reds players
Rochester Red Wings players
Seattle Rainiers players
West Palm Beach Indians players